Bateman is an electoral district of the Legislative Assembly in the Australian state of Western Australia.

The district shares its name with the southern Perth suburb of Bateman, situated in the central part of the electorate. Both the electorate and the suburb are named after members of the Bateman family, who established their home, "Grasmere", at nearby Bulls Creek, in 1886. The seat was created as a result of the 2007 electoral redistribution, largely replacing the former Murdoch electorate. Bateman was regarded as a safe Liberal seat, because Murdoch (itself largely replaced by Jandakot between 1989 and 1996) had been held by the party since the seat's creation in 1977.

Members for Bateman

Election results

References

External links
 Electorate profile (Antony Green, ABC)

Bateman